Bendel may refer to:

 Bendel (surname)
 Mid-Western Region, Nigeria, known as Bendel
 List of Governors of Bendel State
 Bendel United
 Bendel Insurance Football Club (also known as Insurance of Benin Football Club)

See also 
 Benin
 Bendl